In music, an augmented major seventh chord or major seventh sharp five chord is a seventh chord composed of a root, major third, augmented fifth, and major seventh (1, 3, 5, 7). It can be viewed as an augmented triad with an additional major seventh. When using popular-music symbols, it is denoted by augM7, +M7, +7, M75, M7(5), M7/5, M7+5, maj+7, +7, etc. For example, the augmented major seventh chord built on C, written as CaugM7, has pitches C–E–G–B:

 

The chord can be represented by the integer notation {0, 4, 8, 11}.

The augmented major seventh chord is associated with the augmented scale (see jazz scale and chord-scale system). This chord also comes from the third mode of both the harmonic minor and the melodic minor scales. For example, the third mode of the A melodic minor scale outlines an augmented major seventh chord, as shown below.

 

As with dominant seventh chords, nondominant seventh chords including the augmented major seventh usually progress according to the circle, thus III+M7 resolves to vi or VI. For example, in the key of A minor, C maj75 usually resolves to F.

Augmented major seventh chord table
{| class="wikitable"
!Chord
!Root
!Major third
!Augmented fifth
!Major seventh
|-
!align=center|CaugM7
|align=center|C
|align=center|E
|align=center|G
|align=center|B
|-
!align=center|CaugM7
|align=center|C
|align=center|E
|align=center|G
|align=center|B
|-
!align=center|CaugM7
|align=center|C
|align=center|E (F)
|align=center|G (A)
|align=center|B (C)
|-
!align=center|DaugM7
|align=center|D
|align=center|F
|align=center|A
|align=center|C
|-
!align=center|DaugM7
|align=center|D
|align=center|F
|align=center|A
|align=center|C
|-
!align=center|DaugM7
|align=center|D
|align=center|F (G)
|align=center|A (B)
|align=center|C (D)
|-
!align=center|EaugM7
|align=center|E
|align=center|G
|align=center|B
|align=center|D
|-
!align=center|EaugM7
|align=center|E
|align=center|G
|align=center|B (C)
|align=center|D
|-
!align=center|EaugM7
|align=center|E
|align=center|G (A)
|align=center|B (C)
|align=center|D (E)
|-
!align=center|FaugM7
|align=center|F
|align=center|A
|align=center|C
|align=center|E
|-
!align=center|FaugM7
|align=center|F
|align=center|A
|align=center|C
|align=center|E
|-
!align=center|FaugM7
|align=center|F
|align=center|A
|align=center|C (D)
|align=center|E (F)
|-
!align=center|GaugM7
|align=center|G
|align=center|B
|align=center|D
|align=center|F
|-
!align=center|GaugM7
|align=center|G
|align=center|B
|align=center|D
|align=center|F
|-
!align=center|GaugM7
|align=center|G
|align=center|B (C)
|align=center|D (E)
|align=center|F (G)
|-
!align=center|AaugM7
|align=center|A
|align=center|C
|align=center|E
|align=center|G
|-
!align=center|AaugM7
|align=center|A
|align=center|C
|align=center|E (F)
|align=center|G
|-
!align=center|AaugM7
|align=center|A
|align=center|C (D)
|align=center|E (F)
|align=center|G (A)
|-
!align=center|BaugM7
|align=center|B
|align=center|D
|align=center|F
|align=center|A
|-
!align=center|BaugM7
|align=center|B
|align=center|D
|align=center|F (G)
|align=center|A
|}

See also
Jazz chord

References

Seventh chords